Mark McCrea (born 7 September 1987) is a rugby union player for Connacht in the Pro14 competition. He plays Normally on the wing but can play in the centre.

Born in Belfast, Northern Ireland, McCrea signed a year and a half professional contract in January 2008 which will keep him at Ravenhill until June 2009. McCrea had been part of the Ulster Rugby Academy for just over a year when he began training with the senior Ulster team.

In December 2008 it was announced that McCrea had signed a contract extension until 2011.

Connacht
McCrea signed for Connacht for the 2011–2012 season on a 2-year contract. He made his debut for Connacht Rugby against Benetton Treviso and scored his first Connacht try against Scarlets. He has made Three pro 12 appearances for Connacht Rugby and has scored one try.

Ireland U19
McCrea has played for Ireland at under 19 level and has played in a churchill cup. He has been called up to the Ireland Wolfhounds squad before.

Jersey
In February 2013, it was announced that McCrea would join Jersey for the rest of the season and the next year.

References

External links
Ulster Rugby Profile
Ireland A Rugby Profile

Ulster Rugby players
People educated at Belfast High School
Jersey Reds players
1987 births
Living people
Rugby union players from Belfast
Rugby union wings